Pakuba is a location in Northern Uganda.

Location
Pakuba is located in Nwoya District, Acholi sub-region, in Northern Uganda. It is situated in Murchison Falls National Park. The coordinates of Pakuba are:02 20 06N, 31 28 12E (Latitude:2.3350; Longitude:31.4700).

Overview
Pakuba is situated on the eastern bank of the Albert Nile, as the river leaves Lake Albert on its way out of Uganda and into Southern Sudan. During the 1960s, Pakuba was the location of Pakuba Lodge, then a member of the now defunct Uganda Hotels chain. During the 1970s Idi Amin turned the lodge into a State Lodge, for his personal use and enjoyment, as the President of Uganda. Over the years, since his ouster from power in 1979, the facilities went into disrepair. The property is now managed by the Uganda Wildlife Authority and is undergoing renovations. It is expected to re-open for the use of the touring public in  2010.

In 2009, oil exploration in the region around Pakuba, has resulted in oil strikes. The commercial viability of the oil discoveries and how commercial exploitation of those discoveries will balance with the conservation interests are yet to be worked out.

Landmarks
The landmarks within or near Pakuba include:

 Pakuba Safari Lodge - A private safari lodge, that will become operational in 2010.
 Pakuba Airport - A public airport administered by the Uganda Civil Aviation Authority

See also

 Pakuba Airport
 Kabalega Falls Airport
 Murchison Falls National Park
 Murchison Falls
 Nwoya District
 Acholi sub-region
 Northern Region, Uganda

References

External links
 Profile of Murchison Falls National Park
 Paraa Safari Lodge Homepage

Nwoya District
Populated places in Northern Region, Uganda